Ocean deoxygenation is the reduction of the oxygen content of the global oceans and coastal zones due to human activities as a consequence of anthropogenic emissions of carbon dioxide and eutrophication-driven excess production. It is manifest in the increasing number of coastal and estuarine hypoxic areas, or dead zones, and the expansion of oxygen minimum zones (OMZs) in the world's oceans. The decrease in oxygen content of the oceans has been fairly rapid and poses a threat to all aerobic marine life, as well as to people who depend on marine life for nutrition or livelihood.

Oceanographers and others have discussed what phrase best describes the phenomenon to non-specialists. Among the options considered have been ocean suffocation (which was used in a news report from May 2008), "ocean oxygen deprivation", "decline in ocean oxygen", "marine deoxygenation", "ocean oxygen depletion" and "ocean hypoxia". The term “Ocean Deoxygenation” has been used increasingly by international scientific bodies because it captures the decreasing trend of the world ocean's oxygen inventory.

Overview
Oxygen is input into the ocean at the surface, through the processes of photosynthesis by phytoplankton and mixing with the atmosphere. However, organisms, both microbial and multicellular, use oxygen in respiration throughout the entire depth of the ocean, so when the supply of oxygen from the surface is less than the utilization of oxygen in deep water, oxygen loss occurs. This phenomenon is natural, but is exacerbated with increased stratification and/or temperature. Stratification occurs when water masses with different properties, primarily temperature and salinity, are layered, with lower density water on top of higher density water. The larger the differences in the properties between layers, the less mixing occurs between the layers. Stratification is increased when the temperature of the surface ocean or the amount of freshwater input into the ocean from rivers and ice melt increases, enhancing ocean deoxygenation by limiting supply. Another factor that can limit supply is the solubility of oxygen. As temperature and salinity increase, the solubility of oxygen decreases, meaning that less oxygen can be dissolved into water as it warms and becomes more salty.

Ocean deoxygenation is an additional stressor on marine life. Ocean deoxygenation results in the expansion of oxygen minimum zones in the oceans as a consequence of burning fossil fuels. Along with this ocean deoxygenation is caused by an imbalance of sources and sinks of oxygen in dissolved water. Burning fossil fuels consumes oxygen, but because of the large atmospheric oxygen inventory, the associated relative decline of atmospheric oxygen (0.001% per year) is about two orders of magnitude smaller than the current rate of ocean deoxygenation. The change has been fairly rapid and poses a threat to fish and other types of marine life, as well as to people who depend on marine life for nutrition or livelihood. Ocean deoxygenation poses implications for ocean productivity, nutrient cycling, carbon cycling, and marine habitats. Total ocean oxygen content has decreased by 1-2% since 1960.

Ocean warming exacerbates ocean deoxygenation and further stresses marine organisms, limiting nutrient availability by increasing ocean stratification through density and solubility effects while at the same time increasing metabolic demand. The rising temperatures in the oceans cause a reduced solubility of oxygen in the water, which can explain about 50% of oxygen loss in the upper level of the ocean (>1000 m). According to the IPCC 2019 Special Report on the Ocean and Cryosphere in a Changing Climate, the viability of species is being disrupted throughout the ocean food web due to changes in ocean chemistry. As the ocean warms, mixing between water layers decreases, resulting in less oxygen and nutrients being available for marine life. Warmer ocean water holds less oxygen and is more buoyant than cooler water. This leads to reduced mixing of oxygenated water near the surface with deeper water, which naturally contains less oxygen. Warmer water also raises oxygen demand from living organisms; as a result, less oxygen is available for marine life.

Melting of gas hydrates in bottom layers of water may result in the release of more methane from sediments and subsequent consumption of oxygen by aerobic respiration of methane to carbon dioxide. Another effect of climate change on oceans that causes ocean deoxygenation is circulation changes. As the ocean warms from the surface, stratification is expected to increase, which shows a tendency for slowing down ocean circulation, which then increases ocean deoxygenation.
Coastal regions, such as the Baltic Sea, the northern Gulf of Mexico, and the Chesapeake Bay, as well as large enclosed water bodies like Lake Erie, have been affected by deoxygenation due to eutrophication. Excess nutrients are input into these systems by rivers, ultimately from urban and agricultural runoff and exacerbated by deforestation. These nutrients lead to high productivity that produces organic material that sinks to the bottom and is respired. The respiration of that organic material uses up the oxygen and causes hypoxia or anoxia. 
 
Oceanic oxygen minimum zones (OMZ) generally occur in the middle depths of the ocean, from 100 – 1000 m deep, and are natural phenomena that result from respiration of sinking organic material produced in the surface ocean. However, as the oxygen content of the ocean decreases, oxygen minimum zones are expanding both vertically and horizontally.

As low oxygen zones expand vertically nearer to the surface, they can affect coastal upwelling systems such as the California Current on the coast of Oregon (US). These upwelling systems are driven by seasonal winds that force the surface waters near the coast to move offshore, which pulls deeper water up along the continental shelf. As the depth of the deoxygenated deeper water becomes shallower, more of the deoxygenated water can reach the continental shelf, causing coastal hypoxia and fish kills. Impacts of massive fish kills on the aquaculture industry are projected to be profound.

Overall, local Harmful Algal Blooms (HAB), regional dead zones, and the oceanic phenomena of oxygen minimum zones are contributing to ocean-wide deoxygenation.

Global extent
Ocean deoxygenation has led to suboxic, hypoxic, and anoxic conditions in both coastal waters and the open ocean. Since 1950, more than 500 sites in coastal waters have reported oxygen concentrations below 2 mg liter−1, which is generally accepted as the threshold of hypoxic conditions. Several areas of the open ocean have naturally low oxygen concentration due to biological oxygen consumption that cannot be supported by the rate of oxygen input to the area from physical transport, air-sea mixing, or photosynthesis. These areas are called oxygen minimum zones (OMZs), and there is a wide variety of open ocean systems that experience these naturally low oxygen conditions, such as upwelling zones, deep basins of enclosed seas, and the cores of some mode-water eddies. Oxygen-poor waters of coastal and open ocean systems have largely been studied in isolation of each other, with researchers focusing on eutrophication-induced hypoxia in coastal waters and naturally occurring (without apparent direct input of anthropogenic nutrients) open ocean OMZs. However, coastal and open ocean oxygen-poor waters are highly interconnected and therefore both have seen an increase in the intensity, spatial extent, and temporal extent of deoxygenated conditions.

The spatial extent of deoxygenated conditions can vary widely. In coastal waters, regions with deoxygenated conditions can extend from less than one to many thousands of square kilometers. Open ocean OMZs exist in all ocean basins and have similar variation in spatial extent; an estimated 8% of global ocean volume is within OMZs. The largest OMZ is in the eastern tropical north Pacific and comprises 41% of this global volume, and the smallest OMZ is found in the eastern tropical North Atlantic and makes up only 5% of the global OMZ volume. The vertical extent of low oxygen conditions is also variable, and areas of persistent low oxygen have annual variation in the upper and lower limits of oxygen-poor waters. Typically, OMZs are expected to occur at depths of about 200 to 1,000 meters. The upper limit of OMZs is characterized by a strong and rapid gradient in oxygenation, called the oxycline. The depth of the oxycline varies between OMZs, and is mainly affected by physical processes such as air-sea fluxes and vertical movement in the thermocline depth. The lower limit of OMZs is associated with the reduction in biological oxygen consumption, as the majority of organic matter is consumed and respired in the top 1,000 m of the vertical water column. Shallower coastal systems may see oxygen-poor waters extend to bottom waters, leading to negative effects on benthic communities. The temporal duration of oxygen-poor conditions can vary on seasonal, annual, or multi-decadal scales. Hypoxic conditions in coastal systems like the Gulf of Mexico are usually tied to discharges of rivers, thermohaline stratification of the water column, wind-driven forcing, and continental shelf circulation patterns. As such, there are seasonal and annual patterns in the initiation, persistence, and break down of intensely hypoxic conditions. Oxygen concentrations in open oceans and the margins between coastal areas and the open ocean may see variation in intensity, spatial extent, and temporal extent from multi-decadal oscillations in climatic conditions.

Measurement of dissolved oxygen in coastal and open ocean waters for the past 50 years has revealed a marked decline in oxygen content. This decline is associated with expanding spatial extent, expanding vertical extent, and prolonged duration of oxygen-poor conditions in all regions of the global oceans. Examinations of the spatial extent of OMZs in the past through paleoceanographical methods clearly shows that the spatial extent of OMZs has expanded through time, and this expansion is coupled to ocean warming and reduced ventilation of thermocline waters. Many persistent OMZs have increased in thickness over the last five decades through both shoaling of the upper limit and downward expansion of the lower limit. Coastal regions have also seen expanded spatial extent and temporal duration due to increased anthropogenic nutrient input and changes in regional circulation. Areas that have not previously experienced low oxygen conditions, like the coastal shelf of Oregon on the West coast of the United States, have recently and abruptly developed seasonal hypoxia.

The global decrease in oceanic oxygen content is statistically significant and emerging beyond the envelope of natural fluctuations. This trend of oxygen loss is accelerating, with widespread and obvious losses occurring after the 1980s. The rate and total content of oxygen loss varies by region, with the North Pacific emerging as a particular hotspot of deoxygenation due to the increased amount of time since its deep waters were last ventilated (see thermohaline circulation) and related high apparent oxygen utilization (AOU). Estimates of total oxygen loss in the global ocean range from 119 to 680 T mol decade−1 since the 1950s. These estimates represent 2% of the global ocean oxygen inventory. Modeling efforts show that global ocean oxygen loss rates will continue to accelerate up to 125 T mol year−1 by 2100 due to persistent warming, a reduction in ventilation of deeper waters, increased biological oxygen demand, and the associated expansion and shoaling of OMZs.

Climate change

Most of the excess heat from CO2 and other greenhouse gas emissions is absorbed by the oceans. Warmer oceans cause deoxygenation both because oxygen is less soluble in warmer water, and through temperature driven stratification of the ocean which inhibits the production of oxygen from photosynthesis.

The ocean surface stratifies as the atmosphere and ocean warms causing ice melt and glacial runoff. This results in a less salty and therefore a less dense layer that floats on top. Also the warmer waters themselves are less dense. This stratification inhibits the upwelling of nutrients (the ocean constantly recycles its nutrients) into the upper layer of the ocean. This is where the majority of oceanic photosynthesis (such as by phytoplankton) occurs. This decrease in nutrient supply is likely to decrease rates of photosynthesis in the surface ocean, which is responsible for approximately half of the oxygen produced globally. Increased stratification can also decrease the supply of oxygen to the interior of the ocean. Warmer waters also increase the metabolism of marine organisms, leading to increased respiration rates. In the surface ocean, increased respiration will likely lead to lower net oxygen production, and thus less oxygen transferred to the atmosphere. In the interior ocean, the combination of increased respiration and decreased oxygen supply from surface waters can draw oxygen down to hypoxic or anoxic levels. Not only are low levels of oxygen lethal to fish and other upper trophic level species, they can change the microbially mediated cycling of globally important elements (see microbiology of oxygen minimum zones such as nitrogen; nitrate replaces oxygen as the primary microbial electron acceptor at very low oxygen concentrations. All this, increased demand on herbivores, decreased nutrient supply, decreased dissolved oxygen, etc., result in food web mismatches.

Implications
Ocean deoxygenation poses implications for ocean productivity, nutrient cycling, carbon cycling, and marine habitats. Studies have shown that oceans have already lost 1-2% of their oxygen since the middle of the 20th century, and model simulations predict a decline of up to 7% in the global ocean O2 content over the next hundred years. The decline of oxygen is projected to continue for a thousand years or more.

Effects on bioavailability

Bioavailability is a measure of how readily a substance in the environment (generally a molecular substance) can be obtained by an organism. For the aquatic sciences, bioavailability of oxygen is particularly important since it describes the amount of oxygen (supply) relative to the requirements (demand) of a specific organism whereas concentrations describe just the amount of oxygen in the water.

Oxygen supply 
The supply of oxygen available to aquatic organisms is determined by oxygen solubility in water. Oxygen is less soluble in warm, salty water and more soluble in cold, fresh water. The amount of oxygen dissolved in water can be measured as a concentration, percent saturation, or partial pressure. While all these measures tell us how much oxygen is present, partial pressure is the most accurate measure when considering aquatic organisms since the partial pressure of a gas determines how readily it will diffuse across a membrane. If the partial pressure of oxygen is higher on the external, water side of a gill membrane than on the internal, bloodstream side, oxygen will more readily diffuse across the membrane and into the fish.

Oxygen demand 
An organism's demand for oxygen is dependent on its metabolic rate. Metabolic rates can be affected by external factors such as the temperature of the water, and internal factors such as the species, life stage, size, and activity level of the organism.
The body temperature of ectotherms (such as fishes and invertebrates) fluctuates with the temperature of the water. As the external temperature increases, ectotherm metabolisms increase as well, increasing their demand for oxygen. Different species have different basal metabolic rates and therefore different oxygen demands.

Life stages of organisms also have different metabolic demands. In general, younger stages tend to grow in size and advance in developmental complexity quickly. As the organism reaches maturity, metabolic demands switch from growth and development to maintenance, which requires far fewer resources. Smaller organisms have higher metabolisms per unit of mass, so smaller organisms will require more oxygen per unit mass, while larger organisms generally require more total oxygen. Higher activity levels also require more oxygen.

This is why bioavailability is important in deoxygenated systems: an oxygen quantity which is dangerously low for one species might be more than enough for another species.

Indices and calculations 
Several indices to measure bioavailability have been suggested: Respiration Index, Oxygen Supply Index, and the Metabolic Index. The Respiration Index describes oxygen availability based on the free energy available in the reactants and products of the stoichiometric equation for respiration. However, organisms have ways of altering their oxygen intake and carbon dioxide release, so the strict stoichiometric equation is not necessarily accurate. The Oxygen Supply Index accounts for oxygen solubility and partial pressure, along with the Q10 of the organism, but does not account for behavioral or physiological changes in organisms to compensate for reduced oxygen availability. The Metabolic Index accounts for the supply of oxygen in terms of solubility, partial pressure, and diffusivity of oxygen in water, and the organism's metabolic rate. The metabolic index is generally viewed as a closer approximation of oxygen bioavailability than the other indices.

There are two thresholds of oxygen required by organisms: 
 Pcrit (critical partial pressure)- the oxygen level below which an organism cannot support a normal respiration rate
 Pleth (lethal partial pressure)- the oxygen level below which an organism cannot support the minimum respiration rate necessary for survival. 
Since bioavailability is specific to each organism and temperature, calculation of these thresholds is done experimentally by measuring activity and respiration rates under different temperature and oxygen conditions, or by collecting data from separate studies.

Impacts of climate change 
In the context of ocean deoxygenation, species experience the impacts of low oxygen at different levels and rates of oxygen loss, as driven by their thresholds of oxygen tolerance. Generally, we can expect mobile species to move away from areas of lethally low oxygen, but they also experience non-lethal effects of exposure to low oxygen. Further examples are included in the body of this page.

Bioavailability will continue to change in a changing climate. Warming water temperatures mean low solubility of oxygen and increasing deoxygenation, while also increasing the oxygen demands of ectothermic organisms by driving their metabolic rates higher. This positive feedback loop compounds the effects of reduced oxygen concentrations.

Effects on marine taxa

Microbes 
In OMZs oxygen concentration drops to levels <10 nM at the base of the oxycline and can remain anoxic for over 700 m depth. This lack of oxygen can be reinforced or increased due to physical processes changing oxygen supply such as eddy-driven advection, sluggish ventilation, increases in ocean stratification, and increases in ocean temperature which reduces oxygen solubility. At a microscopic scale the processes causing ocean deoxygenation rely on microbial aerobic respiration. Aerobic respiration is a metabolic process that microorganisms like bacteria or archaea use to obtain energy by degrading organic matter, consuming oxygen, producing CO2 and obtaining energy in the form of ATP. In the ocean surface photosynthetic microorganisms called phytoplankton use solar energy and CO2 to build organic molecules (organic matter) releasing oxygen in the process.  A large fraction of the organic matter from photosynthesis becomes dissolved organic matter (DOM) that is consumed by bacteria during aerobic respiration in sunlit waters. Another fraction of organic matter sinks to the deep ocean forming aggregates called marine snow. These sinking aggregates are consumed via degradation of organic matter and respiration at depth.  At depths in the ocean where no light can reach, aerobic respiration is the dominant process. When the oxygen in a parcel of water is consumed, the oxygen cannot be replaced without the water reaching the surface ocean. When oxygen concentrations drop to below <10 nM, microbial processes that are normally inhibit by oxygen can take place like denitrification and anammox. Both processes extract elemental nitrogen from nitrogen compounds and that elemental nitrogen which does not stay in solution escapes as a gas, resulting in a net loss of nitrogen from the ocean.

Zooplankton 
Decreased oxygen availability results in decreases in many zooplankton species’ egg production, food intake, respiration, and metabolic rates. Temperature and salinity in areas of decreased oxygen concentrations also affect oxygen availability. Higher temperatures and salinity lower oxygen solubility decrease the partial pressure of oxygen. This decreased partial pressure increases organisms’ respiration rates, causing the oxygen demand of the organism to increase.

In addition to affecting their vital functions, zooplankton alter their distribution in response to hypoxic or anoxic zones. Many species actively avoid low oxygen zones, while others take advantage of their predators’ low tolerance for hypoxia and use these areas as a refuge. Zooplankton that exhibit daily vertical migrations to avoid predation and low oxygen conditions also excrete ammonium near the oxycline and contribute to increased anaerobic ammonium oxidation (anammox;, which produces N2 gas. As hypoxic regions expand vertically and horizontally, the habitable ranges for phytoplankton, zooplankton, and nekton increasingly overlap, increasing their susceptibility to predation and human exploitation.

The relationship between zooplankton and low oxygen zones is complex and varies by species and life stage. Some gelatinous zooplankton reduce their growth rates when exposed to hypoxia while others utilize this habitat to forage on high prey concentrations with their growth rates unaffected. The ability of some gelatinous zooplankton to tolerate hypoxia may be attributed to the ability to store oxygen in intragel regions. The movements of zooplankton as a result of ocean deoxygenation can affect fisheries, global nitrogen cycling, and trophic relationships. These changes have the potential to have large economic and environmental consequences through overfishing or collapsed food webs.

Fish 

A fish's behavior in response to ocean deoxygenation is based upon their tolerance to oxygen poor conditions. Species with low anoxic tolerance tend to undergo habitat compression in response to the expansion of OMZs. Low tolerance fish start to habitate near the surface of the water column and ventilate at the top layer of the water where it contains higher levels of dissolved oxygen, a behavior called aquatic surface respiration. Biological responses to habitat compression can be varied. Some species of billfish, predatory pelagic predators such as sailfish and marlin, that have undergone habitat compression actually have increased growth since their prey, smaller pelagic fish, experienced the same habitat compression, resulting in increased prey vulnerability to billfishes. Fish with tolerance to anoxic conditions, such as jumbo squid and lanternfish, can remain active in anoxic environments at a reduced level, which can improve their survival by increasing avoidance of anoxia intolerant predators and have increased access to resources that their anoxia intolerant competitors cannot.

Effects on coastal habitats

Coral reefs 
There has been a severe increase in mass mortality events associated with low oxygen causing mass hypoxia with the majority having been in the last 2 decades. The rise in water temperature leads to an increase in oxygen demand and the increase for ocean deoxygenation which causes these large coral reef dead zones. For many coral reefs, the response to this hypoxia is very dependent on the magnitude and duration of the deoxygenation. The symptoms can be anywhere from reduced photosynthesis and calcification to bleaching. Hypoxia can have indirect effects like the abundance of algae and spread of coral diseases in the ecosystems. While coral is unable to handle such low levels of oxygen, algae is quite tolerant. Because of this, in interaction zones between algae and coral, increased hypoxia will cause more coral death and higher spread of algae. The increase mass coral dead zones is reinforced by the spread of coral diseases. Coral diseases can spread easily when there are high concentrations of sulfide and hypoxic conditions. Due to the loop of hypoxia and coral reef mortality, the fish and other marine life that inhabit the coral reefs have a change in behavioral in response to the hypoxia. Some fish will go upwards to find more oxygenated water, and some enter a phase of metabolic and ventilatory depression. Invertebrates migrate out of their homes to the surface of substratum or move to the tips of arborescent coral colonies.

Around 6 million people, the majority who live in developing countries, depend on coral reef fisheries. These mass die-offs due to extreme hypoxic events can have severe impacts on reef fish populations. Coral reef ecosystems offer a variety of essential ecosystem services including shoreline protection, nitrogen fixation, and waste assimilation, and tourism opportunities. The continued decline of oxygen in oceans on coral reefs is concerning because it takes many years (decades) to repair and regrow corals.

Seagrass beds 
Globally, seagrass has been declining rapidly. It is estimated that 21% of the 71 known seagrass species have decreasing population trends and 11% of those species have been designated as threatened on the ICUN Red List. Hypoxia that leads to eutrophication caused form ocean deoxygenation is one of the main underlying factors of these die-offs. Eutrophication causes enhanced nutrient enrichment which can result in seagrass productivity, but with continual nutrient enrichment in seagrass meadows, it can cause excessive growth of microalgae, epiphytes and phytoplankton resulting in hypoxic conditions.

Seagrass is both a source and a sink for oxygen in the surrounding water column and sediments. At night, the inner part of seagrass oxygen pressure is linearly related to the oxygen concentration in the water column, so low water column oxygen concentrations often result in hypoxic seagrass tissues, which can eventually kill off the seagrass. Normally, seagrass sediments must supply oxygen to the below-ground tissue through either photosynthesis or by diffusing oxygen from the water column through leaves to rhizomes and roots. However, with the change in seagrass oxygen balances, it can often result in hypoxic seagrass tissues. Seagrass exposed to this hypoxic water column show increased respiration, reduced rates of photosynthesis, smaller leaves, and reduced number of leaves per shoot. This causes insufficient supply of oxygen to the belowground tissues for aerobic respiration, so seagrass must rely on the less-efficient anaerobic respiration. Seagrass die-offs create a positive feedback loop in which the mortality events cause more death as higher oxygen demands are created when dead plant material decomposes.

Because hypoxia increases the invasion of sulfides in seagrass, this negatively affects seagrass through photosynthesis, metabolism and growth. Generally, seagrass is able to combat the sulfides by supplying enough oxygen to the roots. However, deoxygenation causes the seagrass to be unable to supply this oxygen, thus killing it off.

Deoxygenation reduces the diversity of organisms inhabiting seagrass beds by eliminating species that cannot tolerate the low oxygen conditions. Indirectly, the loss and degradation of seagrass threatens numerous species that rely on seagrass for either shelter or food. The loss of seagrass also effects the physical characteristics and resilience of seagrass ecosystems. Seagrass beds provide nursery grounds and habitat to many harvested commercial, recreational, and subsistence fish and shellfish. In many tropical regions, local people are dependent on seagrass associated fisheries as a source of food and income.

Seagrass also provides many ecosystem services including water purification, coastal protection, erosion control, sequestration and delivery of trophic subsidies to adjacent marine and terrestrial habitats. Continued deoxygenation causes the effects of hypoxia to be compounded by climate change which will increase the decline in seagrass populations.

Mangrove forests 
Compared to seagrass beds and coral reefs, hypoxia is more common on a regular basis in mangrove ecosystems, through ocean deoxygenation is compounding the negative effects by anthropogenic nutrient inputs and land use modification.

Like seagrass, mangrove trees transport oxygen to roots of rhizomes, reduce sulfide concentrations, and alter microbial communities. Dissolved oxygen is more readily consumed in the interior of the mangrove forest. Anthropogenic inputs may push the limits of survival in many mangrove microhabitats. For example, shrimp ponds constructed in mangrove forests are considered the greatest anthropogenic threat to mangrove ecosystems. These shrimp ponds reduce estuary circulation and water quality which leads to the promotion of diel-cycling hypoxia. When the quality of the water degrades, the shrimp ponds are quickly abandoned leaving massive amounts of wastewater. This is a major source of water pollution that promotes ocean deoxygenation in the adjacent habitats.

Due to these frequent hypoxic conditions, the water does not provide habitats to fish. When exposed to extreme hypoxia, ecosystem function can completely collapse. Extreme deoxygenation will affect the local fish populations, which are an essential food source. The environmental costs of shrimp farms in the mangrove forests grossly outweigh their economic benefits. Cessation of shrimp production and restoration of these areas and reduce eutrophication and anthropogenic hypoxia.

See also

Anoxic event
Anoxic waters
Dead zone (ecology)
Ocean acidification
Microbiology of oxygen minimum zones
Seaweed#Bioremediation

References

External links

Ocean Deoxygenation
NASA: Ocean Deoxygenation: Past, Present, and Future
Video: Ocean Deoxygenation, Our Ocean's Oxygen Supply & Demand Issue

Oceanographical terminology
Environmental issues with water
Oxygen